Derrell Simpson is a former member of the Commission for National and Community Service for the District of Columbia.

He has been named one of “America’s Daring Dozen” by Edutopia magazine, “Young Power Broker” by Black Entertainment Television (BET), and “Little Big Shot” by the Washington City Paper.

References

People from Washington, D.C.
Living people
Year of birth missing (living people)